|}

The Fort Leney Novice Chase, currently ran as the Neville Hotels Novice Chase, is a Grade 1 National Hunt steeplechase in Ireland. It is run over a distance of 3 miles (4,828 metres) at Leopardstown and during its running there are 17 fences to be jumped. It takes place annually during the Christmas Festival meeting, usually on 29 December.

The race was previously run as a Grade 3 and Grade 2 race, before being awarded Grade 1 status in 2003. The 2014 race was run as the Topaz Novice Chase.

Records
Leading jockey (3 wins):
 Davy Russell – Cailin Alainn (2006), Delta Work (2018), Battleoverdoyen (2019)

Leading trainer (5 wins):
 Gordon Elliott – No More Heroes (2015), 	Shattered Love (2017), Delta Work (2018), Battleoverdoyen (2019), Fury Road (2021)

Winners since 1996

See also
 Horse racing in Ireland
 List of Irish National Hunt races

References
Racing Post:
, 

National Hunt races in Ireland
National Hunt chases
Leopardstown Racecourse